Revengeance may refer to:
 Metal Gear Rising: Revengeance, a video game spinoff in the Metal Gear series by Konami, formerly known as Metal Gear Solid: Rising
 "Revengeance", a song by American metal band Soulfly on their album Enslaved
 The Revengencers, a fictional terrorist organization in the animated television series Metalocalypse
 "The Revengencers", a season 2 episode of Metalocalypse
Revengeance (film), American film